Sekolah Menengah Sains Raja Tun Azlan Shah (abbreviated SERATAS) is a boarding school located 3 km from the town of Taiping, Perak, Malaysia. It is situated at the foot of Bukit Larut (Maxwell Hill). The school was formerly known as Sekolah Menengah Sains Perak and as Sekolah Menengah Sains Taiping or SEMESTA.

1982 establishments in Malaysia
Educational institutions established in 1982
Co-educational boarding schools
Taiping, Perak